Nar Parvat is a mountain peak located at  above sea level in the state of Uttarakhand in India and the prominence is .

Location  
The peak is located in the north west of Valley of Flowers National Park and it separates the Badrinath valley from this valley. Also, Kshir Ganga originates from this mountain.

References 

Mountains of Uttarakhand